The Cannon 76/40 Model 1916 was a widely used naval gun on ships of the Royal Italian Navy during World War I and World War II.  A very versatile weapon it was used as primary, secondary and tertiary armament on a number of ship classes.  After being replaced aboard ships of the Royal Italian Navy it saw widespread use on land in a number of different roles such as coastal artillery, anti-aircraft gun and railroad gun during World War II.

History
The 76/40 Model 1916's origins lay in the British QF 12-pounder 12 cwt naval gun designed 1893 and first produced in 1897. The QF 12-pounder 12 cwt gun was designed and produced by the Elswick Ordnance Company for the British Royal Navy and also for export customers.  Italy and Japan were two early export customers that later purchased production licenses for the gun.  The majority of the Italian guns were produced by the Ansaldo Company from a design provided during World War I by the Armstrong Company, the parent company of EOC.

Construction
The 76/40 Model 1916 was a fairly complicated design with an A tube, a shrunk-on jacket that extended to the breech, and a B tube which extended to the muzzle. Over the jacket and B tube a C hoop was shrunk on, which screwed onto the jacket and secured the B tube.  There was a shortened version of the gun called the 76/30 Model 1915, which was used on a few classes of destroyers, submarines, tugs and minesweepers.  The 76/30 Model 1915 were also used as truck mounted artillery during both world wars.  The mounts for the Italian guns differed from their British counterparts and there were five different varieties.  The quick-fire breech was identical to that of the Royal Navy gun, except for the cartridge extractor and the firing mechanism. Traverse and elevation were manual, and a crew of seven were needed to man the gun.  The guns fired fixed quick-fire ammunition and a crew could sustain a rate of fire of 12 to 15 rounds per minute.

Mounts available:
 Model 1915 - pedestal mount: -10° to +42° elevation, which weighed  complete.
 Regia Marina Model 1916 - pedestal mount: -10° to +65° elevation, which weighed  complete.
 Ansaldo Model 1917 - pedestal mount: -10° to +75° elevation, which weighed  complete.
 Cannone da 76/40 C.A. - pedestal mount: -5° to +75° elevation, which weighed  complete.
 Cannone da 76/40 modificata 35 - pedestal mount: -6° to +81° elevation, which weighed  complete.

Naval use
The 76/40 Model 1916 was widely used on a number of different types and classes of ships.  It was often mounted in single casemates, turrets or on unprotected pivot mounts.  It was used aboard pre-dreadnought battleships, dreadnought battleships, protected cruisers, armored cruisers, light cruisers, destroyers, torpedo boats, minesweepers, submarines, gunboats, lighters and armored trains of the Royal Italian Navy.

Ship classes that carried the 76/40 include:

Anti-aircraft use
In 1933 the navy began replacing the 76/40.  Salvaged guns were mounted on a high angle pedestal mount and given the designation Cannone da 76/40 C.A. and assigned to anti-aircraft and coastal artillery units of the Royal Italian Army.  In 1935 some guns were given new recuperators and higher angle mounts and redesignated as the Cannone da 76/40 modificata 35.  Slow traverse, slow elevation, low muzzle velocity, lack of automated fire direction and lack of automatic fuse setting hindered its use as an anti-aircraft gun.  However it was estimated that Italy had 730 Cannone da 76/40 C.A. and Cannone da 76/40 modificata 35 guns in use during World War II.  These remained in use together with 66/47, 76/45 Model 1911, 100/47, 102/35 and 102/45 due to insufficient numbers of the newer Cannone da 75/46 and Cannone da 90/53.  Unmodified guns taken over by Germany after the Italian defeat were given the designation 7.62 cm Flak 266/1 (i) and modified guns were given the designation 7.62 cm Flak 266/2 (i).

Autocannon use
During World War I the Royal Italian Navy created two batteries, four guns each of truck-mounted anti-aircraft guns. These were referred to as "autocannoni". The guns were Model 1915 76/30's mounted on Fiat 18 B.L.R. trucks. These batteries were used to defend Italian naval bases, although one battery was attached to the Royal Italian Army late in the war. During the inter-war period a third battery equipped with six truck-mounted 76/30 guns was created and the earlier guns were mounted on new Lancia R0 truck chassis. In 1942 some of the guns were again mounted on newer Fiat 634N truck chassis. These guns mainly used as anti-aircraft guns with secondary anti-tank and field artillery roles. The three batteries equipped with 76/30 guns were the 13th and 14th Batteries with five guns each, and the 16th Battery with four guns. The 14th was assigned to the 60th Infantry Division "Sabratha", while the 16th was assigned to the 16th Motorized Division "Pistoia". The last seven surviving guns were part of the 131st Armored Division "Centauro" when it surrendered in Tunisia in May 1943.

Photo gallery

Notes

Bibliography
 
 
 
  http://www.navweaps.com/Weapons/WNBR_3-40_mk1.php
 

76 mm artillery
Naval guns of Italy
Anti-aircraft guns of Italy
World War I naval weapons
World War II naval weapons
World War I artillery of Italy
World War II artillery of Italy
World War II anti-aircraft guns